Alexsandro Fernandes Xavier (born April 4, 1973 in Recife, Brazil), often known simply as Alex Fernandes, is a former Brazilian football striker.

Club career
Before coming to Mexico, Fernandes played for Brazilian clubs Sport Recife, Náutico, and Mogi Mirim.

Monarcas Morelia
He joined the Primera División for the 1999 Winter season, debuting for Monarcas Morelia.  He would remain with Morelia through the 2002 Apertura, when he was transferred to Monterrey.

Fernandes made a strong debut in Mexico, scoring seven goals in 19 games in the 1999 Invierno, and another nine in the Verano.  In total, he scored 72 goals for Morelia in his four years there, including 15 in the 2002 Apertura before his transfer to Monterrey.

Monterrey
Alex began promisingly with Monterrey as well, scoring 9 goals in 24 games in the 2003 Clausura, and another 11 goals in the Apertura. In that season CF Monterrey, managed by Daniel Passarella, won the Clausura 2003 Championship, and Alex, as well as his teammates, played a key role in the team through the whole season. However, his form dipped in 2004, as he only made nine appearances in the 2004 Clausura, scoring six goals, and only four in the 2004 Apertura, scoring none.

In the Clausura 2005, Alex participation again diminished because of several injuries, but by the Apertura 2005 he was ready to reappear and his goals along with Guillermo Franco's led the team to the Finals. Although he didn't play the Finale against Toluca, because of an injury during the Semifinals against archrival Tigres, Alex is widely recognized as being part of the team's success and effectiveness during that season.

This would be Alex's last tournament until the Apertura 2007 when, after a break from the soccer fields, he returned to CF Monterrey with renewed expectations and hoping to exceed the effectiveness he achieved along with former teammate Guillermo Franco. But once that season ended, in December 2007, Alex finally decided to retire from the soccer fields once and for all.

Alex leaves a decent history in football, including successful performances in severals clubs in Brazil and Mexico, but especially in Mexico where he was recognized as an excellent striker and for winning a championship with both of his teams, Monarcas Morelia in Winter 2000 and CF Monterrey in Clausura 2003.

Honours

Club
Morelia
Mexican Primera División: Invierno 2000

Monterrey
Mexican Primera División: Clausura 2003

References

External links

1973 births
Living people
Brazilian emigrants to Mexico
Naturalized citizens of Mexico
Association football forwards
Brazilian footballers
Mexican footballers
Alex
Alex
Alex
Atlético Morelia players
C.F. Monterrey players
Liga MX players
Expatriate footballers in Mexico
Sportspeople from Recife